Dustin is a French short drama film, directed by Naïla Guiguet and released in 2020. The film stars Dustin Muchwitz as Dustin, a trans woman attending a rave with her boyfriend Félix (Félix Maritaud).

The film was named as an official selection of the International Critics' Week program at the 2020 Cannes Film Festival, but was not able to be screened due to the cancellation of the festival in light of the COVID-19 pandemic in France. It was screened at the 2020 Toronto International Film Festival, where it was named the winner of the IMDbPro Short Cuts Award for Best International Short Film.

References

External links

2020 films
2020 short films
2020 LGBT-related films
French drama short films
French LGBT-related films
2020 drama films
LGBT-related short films
LGBT-related drama films
Films about trans women
2020s French-language films
2020s French films